Harold D. Young was an English professional rugby league footballer who played in the 1920s and 1930s.

Playing career
Harold Young was born in Cumberland, England.

International honours
Young won caps for England while at Bradford Northern in 1928 against Wales, while at Huddersfield in 1929 against Other Nationalities, in 1930 against Other Nationalities, in 1931 against Wales, and while at Huddersfield he won a cap playing  for Great Britain in the 3-0 victory over Australia in the 1929–30 Kangaroo tour of Great Britain at Athletic Grounds, Rochdale on 15 January 1930.

Club career
Young was transferred from Hensingham ARLFC to Bradford Northern during September 1926, he was transferred from Huddersfield to Castleford during September 1933. His new club offered him on the transfer list in November of that year.

Note
Harold Young and the similarly named Harry Young had overlapping playing careers at Bradford Northern, and consequently some references incorrectly merge their details.

References

External links
Photograph "Harold Young - Cumbrian Harold Young was Bradford Northern's first Australasian Tourist in 1928. After a short spell at Huddersfield he returned to Bradford in 1933 and was still with the club when they moved to Odsal. - 01/01/1927" at rlhp.co.uk
Photograph "Bradford Northern 1927/28 - One of the more successful of Bradford Northern's sides of the 1920s, this team finished sixteenth. They then had to sell Harold Young, Jack Cox, Teddy Melling and Stanley Brogden within the next two years and finished bottom of the league for the next f… - 01/01/1928" at rlhp.co.uk
Search for "Harold Young" at britishnewspaperarchive.co.uk

Bradford Bulls players
Castleford Tigers players
England national rugby league team players
English rugby league players
Great Britain national rugby league team players
Huddersfield Giants players
People from Cumberland
Place of birth missing
Place of death missing
Rugby league locks
Rugby league players from Cumbria
Year of birth missing
Year of death missing